Upper Mai-C Hydropower Station is a 6.1 MW run-of-river hydro-electric plant located in the Ilam District of Nepal. It is powered by water from the Mai Khola.

Location and water supply

The Upper Mai-C Hydropower Station (UMCHEP) is located in the Mabu and Sulubung VDCs, in Sandakpur Gaunpalika, Ilam district.
The flow from Mai Khola is used to generate 6.1 MW electricity.
Upper Mai C is a cascade project that uses the discharge from the tailrace of the Upper Mai Hydropower Station and additional discharge from streams that flow into the Mai river.
The station one of ten operational or under construction power plants on the Mai Khola.

Technical

Water is discharged through a  tailrace.

The powerhouse contains two horizontal Francis turbines with rated net head  and discharge , each with 3050 kW rated output.
There are two synchronous brushless 6.6 kV generators.
A three-phase transformer steps up the voltage to 132 kV for transmission over a line that is combined with the Upper Mai Hydropower Station.
Average electricity generated is 30 GWH.
Electricity is carried to the Godak substation of the NEA along a  132 kv transmission line.

Commercial

The plant is owned and developed by Panchakanya Mai Hydropower, an Independent Power Producer. 
The company was incorporated on 30 January 2003 as East Nepal Development Endeavour Private Limited. 
It was renamed to Mai Valley Hydropower Private Limited on 15 January 2009, then to Panchakanya Mai Hydropower Limited (PMHL) on 21 March 2016.

The estimated cost of the project was NPR 1,050 million, of which about 64.36% was to be financed through bank loans and the remainder from equity.
In January 2018 the company said it was offering 10% of its IPO shares for sale to local people of Sandakpur Rural Municipality and Ilam Municipality.
However, as of April 2018 it was listed among hydropower companies operating after 2010 that had not issued local shares.

The plant came into commercial operation on 24 July 2017 (2074-04-09BS).
The generation licence will expire after 35 years 2105-03-20 BS, after which the plant will be handed over to the government.
The power station is connected to the national grid and the electricity is sold to Nepal Electricity Authority.
The tariff is NPR 4.8 per kWhr in the wet season and NPR 8.4 per kWhr in the dry season.

See also

List of power stations in Nepal

References

Sources

 

 

Hydroelectric power stations in Nepal
Gravity dams
Run-of-the-river power stations
Dams in Nepal
Irrigation in Nepal
Buildings and structures in Ilam District